Production Way–University is an elevated station on the Expo and Millennium Lines of Metro Vancouver's SkyTrain rapid transit system. The station is located at the intersection of Lougheed Highway and Production Way in Burnaby, British Columbia, Canada. Initially a Millennium Line station, a reorganization of SkyTrain service patterns in 2016 made Production Way–University a terminus for a branch of the Expo Line.

History
Production Way–University station was opened in 2002 as part of the original Millennium Line project. The station was designed by the architecture firm Hotson Bakker Architects.

In 2016, SkyTrain service was reconfigured in anticipation of the opening of the Evergreen Extension; as a result, Production Way–University station became a terminus station of an Expo Line branch running between this station and Waterfront station in Downtown Vancouver. At the same time, the Millennium Line service was altered with trains running between VCC–Clark and Lougheed Town Centre stationslater extended to Lafarge Lake–Douglas station when service began on the Evergreen Extensioninstead of the previous service between VCC–Clark and Waterfront stations.

Services
Production Way–University station is a major transfer point for Simon Fraser University, as well as providing connections to local suburban buses. It is the terminus of the 145 bus route running to SFU, which carries just over half of all bus traffic to the university. The station's commercial spaces include a convenience store and several restaurants. The station also has a 220-space parking lot.

Proposed gondola
The SFU Community Trust has proposed extending the TransLink system from this station through the installation of a tri-cable gondola lift that would travel up Burnaby Mountain to the SFU Transit Exchange. The proposed lift would use a 30-passenger Doppelmayr Garaventa 3S Gondola, the same model as the Whistler Blackcomb Peak 2 Peak Gondola. The Trust has proposed the gondola because it felt the system is not weather-dependent like buses, cheaper to maintain, and more environmentally friendly. The provincial government commissioned a feasibility study for the proposal, but in 2012, a business case concluded that building and operating a gondola would cost $12 million more compared to continuing to serve the SFU campus by bus. Therefore, the construction of a gondola was shelved. In December 2018, Kevin Desmond, TransLink's CEO, indicated that while a gondola to SFU had been added to the second phase of the TransLink 10-Year Investment Plan in 2018, its construction hinged on funding from senior levels of government.

Station information

Station layout

Entrances
The main point of entry to Production Way–University station is located on the western side of the stationhouse at the northeast corner of Production Way and Lougheed Highway. A secondary entrance is located adjacent to the stations bus exchange.

Transit connections

Bays 1 to 3 are located inside the loop while bay 4 is located on Lougheed Highway, westbound.

References

Expo Line (SkyTrain) stations
Millennium Line stations
Railway stations in Canada opened in 2002
Buildings and structures in Burnaby
Simon Fraser University
2002 establishments in British Columbia